Denis Shchetkin (born 14 September 1982) is a Kazakhstan footballer who played as a defender.

Career
Shchetkin began playing professional football with FC Irtysh Pavlodar in 1999, where he won the Kazakhstan Premier League. He scored four goals in 101 Premier League appearances during his career.

References

External links

1982 births
Living people
FC Irtysh Pavlodar players
Association football defenders
Kazakhstani footballers
Kazakhstan international footballers
FC Ekibastuz players
FC Kaisar players
FC Okzhetpes players
FC Kyzylzhar players
FC Altai Semey players